Leonardo Mayer was the defending champion, but chose not to participate this year.

Rafael Nadal won the title, defeating Fabio Fognini in the final 7–5, 7–5.

Seeds

Draw

Finals

Top half

Bottom half

Qualifying

Seeds

Qualifiers

Qualifying draw

First qualifier

Second qualifier

Third qualifier

Fourth qualifier

References
Main Draw
Qualifying Draw

Sinlges